Servicio Meteorológico Nacional may refer to one of the following national weather services:
 Servicio Meteorológico Nacional (Argentina)
 Servicio Meteorológico Nacional (Mexico)

See also
National Weather Service (United States), known in Spanish as Servicio Nacional de Meteorología